Wimbledon Park is a London Underground station in Wimbledon. The station is on the District line and is between Southfields and Wimbledon stations. The station is located on Arthur Road close to the junction with Melrose Avenue close to the eastern side of Wimbledon Park.

History

The extension was built by the London and South Western Railway (L&SWR) which, starting on 1 July 1889, ran its own trains over the line from a connection at East Putney to its  to  line.

The section of the District line from Putney Bridge to Wimbledon was the last part of the line to be converted from steam operation to electric. Electric trains began running on 27 August 1905.

Main line services through Wimbledon Park ended on 4 May 1941. By then, the station was on a line of the Southern Railway (successor to the L&SWR), although the line remained in British Rail ownership until 1 April 1994 when it was transferred to London Underground. Until the transfer, the station was branded as a British Rail station. The route from Wimbledon to Wandsworth Town (Point Pleasant Junction) is still used by South Western Railway for empty stock movements and occasional service train diversions, as well as three daily South Western Railway services which run to and from Waterloo via the route in the early hours of the morning; so South Western Railway trains pass through Wimbledon Park station on a daily basis, but without stopping. There are very infrequent movements of Network Rail engineering trains and light engine movements through the station as well.

On 18 June 2012, Surrey cricketer Tom Maynard was electrocuted and hit by a London Underground train while trying to escape from police near Wimbledon Park station.

In 2018, it was announced that the station would gain step free access by 2022, as part of a £200m investment to increase the number of accessible stations on the Tube. Step-free access was achieved in September 2021.

Connections

 London Buses route 156 serve the station.

Past plans
Wimbledon Park was a proposed stop on the Chelsea-Hackney Line, now known as Crossrail 2. It was envisioned that the station's District line services would have been replaced by the new line.

References

External links

 London Transport Museum Photographic Archive

District line stations
Proposed Chelsea-Hackney Line stations
Tube stations in the London Borough of Merton
Former London and South Western Railway stations
Railway stations in Great Britain opened in 1889
Buildings and structures in Wimbledon, London